Buck's Upper Mill Farm, also known as Henry Buck House, is a historic home located at Bucksville in Horry County, South Carolina. The house was built about 1838 and is a typical two-story, central hall, framed farmhouse, or "I"-House.  The front façade features a full-length, one-story porch with a shed roof supported by six square posts. Also on the property are a one-story frame building constructed in the 19th century as a commissary for Buck's lumber business, and the ruins of a sawmill (such as a round brick smokestack on a square base).

It was listed on the National Register of Historic Places in 1982.

References

Houses on the National Register of Historic Places in South Carolina
Houses completed in 1838
Houses in Horry County, South Carolina
National Register of Historic Places in Horry County, South Carolina